The 2010 Duramed Futures Tour was a series of professional women's golf tournaments held from March through September 2010 in the United States. The Futures Tour is the second-tier women's professional golf tour in the United States and is the "official developmental tour" of the LPGA Tour. In 2010, total prize money on the Futures Tour was $1,920,000, the highest in the 30-year history of the Tour, and for the first time ever, played outside the USA, with one tournament in La Riviera Nayarit, Mexico.

Leading money winners
The top ten money winners at the end of the season gained membership on the LPGA Tour for the 2011 season, with those finishing in the top five positions gaining higher priority for entry into events than those finishing in positions six through ten. Finishers in positions six through ten had the option to attend LPGA Qualifying School to try to improve their membership status for 2011.

Schedule and results
The number in parentheses after winners' names show the player's total number of official money, individual event wins on the Futures Tour including that event.

Tournaments in bold are majors
1Tournament shortened to 18 holes due to rain.

See also
2010 LPGA Tour
2010 in golf

External links
Official site

Symetra Tour
Futures Tour